is a Japanese female professional ten-pin bowler. She is a member of the Ladies Bowling Organization of Japan.

Major accomplishments  
 2008 - All-Japan University Individual Championships (3rd place)

DHC
 DHC Ladies Bowling Tour 2007/08 - 2nd leg (5th place)
 DHC Cup Girls Team Challenge (5th place)
 DHC Ladies Bowling Tour 2007/08 - 3rd leg (4th place)

References

External links 
DHC Profile

1985 births
Living people
Sportspeople from Ōita Prefecture
Japanese ten-pin bowling players
Chiba University of Commerce alumni